The Grove is an unincorporated community in Coryell County, Texas, United States. It is located some 16 miles southeast of Gatesville, Texas in the eastern portion of the county.  The Grove is located on Texas State Highway 36.  The area is known for its abundance of Texas bluebonnet flowers during the spring.

History
The Grove was established around 1859 and was named for a grove of Texas live oak trees nearby.  By the late 1860s, the community had two general stores, a mill, and a cotton gin.  In 1870, a group of Wendish settlers from Weigersdorf, Germany, arrived. They established St. Paul Lutheran Church (which exists to this day). By this time, Baptist, Methodist, Disciples of Christ, and Presbyterian churches were also in the community.

In 1874, the post office was established. J. B. Coleman was the first postmaster.  Between 1880 and 1900, the community continued to grow with three general stores, two grocery stores. and a population of 150. By the first decade of the 1900s. the community had a two-teacher public school (with 60 students) and a Lutheran private school.

During the 1940s, the community began to decline when it was bypassed by Highway 36. In the late 1940s, several local farmers were forced to relocate due to the construction of the North Fort Hood training center of Fort Hood. Due to population declines, the public school in The Grove was closed in 1948, while the Lutheran school continued to operate until 1962.

The population of The Grove has varied over the years from a peak of 400 around the turn of the century to about 65 in 2000.

Today, the St. Paul Lutheran Church is still active in the community. The old church cemetery is a few miles away on Highway 36. Many of the town's original buildings are still standing on Main Street, and several have been restored to their former glory. On many weekends, local bands perform on Main Street.

Though The Grove, Texas Museum is now closed, it is still deemed an historical Texas town by the Smithsonian Institution and was the cover story in the 11 August 2008 issue of Forbes.

References

External links

Unincorporated communities in Coryell County, Texas
Unincorporated communities in Texas
Sorbian-American culture in Texas